The Epps 1912 Monoplane was designed and built in 1912 by Ben T. Epps from Athens, Georgia.

The Epps 1912 Monoplane is an open cockpit, single engine, mid-winged, wire braced monoplane, with conventional landing gear supplemented with skids.

Variants 
1971 Epps Monoplane
A homebuilt replica of the 1911-1912 monoplane built and flown by Ben Epps Jr.

References

1910s United States experimental aircraft
Aircraft first flown in 1912
High-wing aircraft
Single-engined pusher aircraft
Canard aircraft